The discography of A, a British alternative rock band, currently consists of four studio albums, one live album, one extended play (EP), and sixteen singles.

Albums

Studio albums

Live albums

Extended plays

Singles

Notes

References

Rock music group discographies
Discographies of British artists